British football clubs tours over South America contributed to the spread and develop of football in the region during the first years of the 20th century. The first club to tour on the region was Southampton F.C. in 1904, followed by several teams (mainly from England although some Scottish clubs also visited South America) until 1929 with Chelsea F.C. being the last team to tour.

During those 25 years of tours, British teams' performances were decreasing while the South American squads' style of playing improved. Indeed, Southampton won all of their matches in 1904 with 40 goals scored in 1904 while Chelsea was defeated eight times (over 16 games played) in their 1929 tour.

Background 

Football (and other British-origin sports like rugby union) were gaining popularity in Argentina and Uruguay and the associations brought foreign teams to their countries as a way of encourage the practise of the sport among the large number of enthusiasts. In fact, Argentine Primera División was the first football league outside of the British Isles, having been held since 1891 to the present.

British teams were considered the best in the world by then, and some of them served as inspiration to establish football clubs in Argentina and Uruguay, helped by the immigration of British citizens that had arrived to work for British companies (mostly in railway construction). CURCC (in Uruguay), Belgrano A.C., Rosario A.C., Alumni and Quilmes (in Argentina) are some examples of clubs established by British immigrants to South America.

Football had been introduced many years ago in both countries, being the first game played in Argentina on June 20, 1867, with the establishment of Buenos Aires Football Club, the first football club not only in Argentina but in South America. In Uruguay, football had been introduced in 1870. Argentina organised its first league championship, Primera División, in 1891 while its Uruguayan homonymous held its first championship in 1900.

Both countries considered themselves rivals due to their proximity. Moreover, they had the only organised bodies in South America and had held some earlier competitions such as Tie Cup (1900) or Copa de Honor Cousenier (1905), played by champions of each association.

In some cases, the influence of British clubs on Argentine football extended to the colours adopted by some clubs. Arístides Langone, president of Club Atlético Independiente, was so impressed by the Nottingham Forest squad that beat local Alumni by 6–0 that he suggested to change the jersey colours from white and blue to red. The request was approved and Independiente adopted the colour that would later become an identity mark for the club, being known as El Rojo (The Red).

Some versions also state that Quilmes A.C. was another institution that took the colours from a British squad, in this case the white jersey with blue details of the England national team, although there is no evidence to prove that statement.

Tours 
Southampton F.C. was the first foreign club to tour South America, followed by Nottingham Forest F.C. in 1905. One of its games, against Alumni in Buenos Aires, was attended by 10,000 spectators, what proves the interest of Argentine fans to see the local forces facing British sides, considered technically superior by them.

The first team to defeat a British side was Argentine Alumni, who defeated the South Africa team (mostly composed of British–origin players) by 1–0 at Sociedad Sportiva Argentina stadium in Palermo. The relevance of the victory was expressed by local media, such as La Nación writing: "For our national football, the Alumni v South Africa match was a great triumph that will be remembered for a long time in everyone's memory, serving as example and stimulus for the future", while British-origin newspaper The Standard wrote "it was a glorious victory and what happened in La Sportiva is promising for Argentine football".

Corinthian F.C. of London was the first British club to tour Brazil in 1910, playing ten games in the cities of Rio de Janeiro and Sao Paulo. The team inspired a group of railway workers to establish a club which they named after the British team, therefore S.C. Corinthians was founded in September 1910.

Corinthian F.C. would return to Brazil in 1913, becoming the only British team that toured South America twice.

Exeter City was the first British team to play beyond Argentina and Uruguay when they reached Brazil to play a series of friendly matches in Rio de Janeiro (most of them v. local combined teams), finishing their tour on July 21, 1914, when Exeter played Brazil national team, in which was the first match ever played by the scratch.

Nevertheless, newspapers in Argentina were left disappointed with City's performances during the tour. Tribuna describing them as "the most mediocre team of professionals sent out by the FA from the home of football", and the Buenos Aires Herald complaining that the Grecians were not "sufficiently superior".

Plymouth Argyle thrashed the Uruguay national team 4–0 in their first game (Uruguay went on to win the first ever World Cup just six years later) before pulling off another shock by beating Argentina 1–0. Plymouth Argyle was the team that faced Argentina most times, with 4 matches played between both squads.

In the match against Boca Juniors on 9 July 1924, the Boca Juniors supporters invaded the pitch after their team had scored the opening goal and carried all eleven home players shoulder high around the stadium. After a half hour delay, the referee restarted the match, but a further invasion was sparked when the referee awarded a penalty against the home side. When the match was again restarted, the Argyle players had agreed that Patsy Corcoran would take the spot-kick and miss, to prevent another pitch invasion. However, the ultra-competitive Russell was not prepared to accept this, and just before Corcoran was about to take the penalty he was pushed aside by Russell who took it himself and scored. This prompted a further pitch invasion by the Boca fans and this time the match was abandoned.

Chelsea F.C. was the last British club to tour South America, in 1929. Since the first tour in 1904, the South American players had evolved a lot, as they were described as "true masters in tactical play" by Chelsea chairman Kirby himself. He also remarked the style and ball control on offer, perhaps a consequence of the outstanding sporting facilities many of the amateur teams possessed. The evolution of South American football was also evident in the tour results: of 16 games played during their three months tour, Chelsea only won five, with eight loses. On the other hand, the Chelsea players emphasised the "unfair play" of some Argentine players and the violent surrounding atmosphere of the supporters in Argentina. The Chelsea management complained to the Football Association that "non-observance of the laws of the game hindered real football".

Some players that were part of British teams touring South America, would then hired as coaches in the continent. Walter Bull of Totenham Hotspur went to Argentina, John Harley to Uruguay (he died there in 1959) while John Hamilton went to Brazil in 1907, becoming the first professional coach in the country.

List of British clubs by year of tour 
Countries visited indicated in each case:
  Toured
  Not toured

Matches details (by club)
Complete list of visitors and games played in Argentina, Uruguay and Brazil.

 Indicates British clubs defeats.

Southampton

Notes

Nottingham Forest 

Notes

South Africa 

Notes

Match details

Everton

Tottenham Hotspur

Corinthian (1910) 

Notes

Swindon Town

Corinthian (1913)

Exeter City

Match details

Third Lanark

Plymouth Argyle

Motherwell 

Notes

Chelsea

References

Football in the United Kingdom
B
B
B
B